Just in Case may refer to:

 "Just in case" (catachresis), a phrase used by some philosophers to denote  "if and only if"
 Just in Case (novel), a young adult novel by Meg Rosoff
 Just in case, traditional manufacturing systems used before the influence of modern technologies
 "Just in Case" (Ronnie Milsap song), 1975
 "Just in Case" (The Forester Sisters song), 1985; also recorded by Exile
 Just in Case (Fear the Walking Dead)
 "Just in Case", a song by Jaheim from Ghetto Love (album), 2001

See also
 Justin Case (disambiguation)
 JIC (disambiguation)